Midge Decter (née Rosenthal; July 25, 1927 – May 9, 2022) was an American journalist and author. Originally a liberal, she was one of the pioneers of the neoconservative movement in the 1970s and 1980s.

Early life
Decter was born in Saint Paul, Minnesota, on July 25, 1927. She was the youngest of three daughters of Rose (née Calmenson) and Harry Rosenthal, a sporting goods merchant. Her family was Jewish. She attended the University of Minnesota for one year, the Jewish Theological Seminary of America from 1946 to 1948, and New York University, but did not graduate from any of them.  She initially identified as a liberal on the political spectrum.

Career
Decter was assistant editor at Midstream, before working as secretary to the then-editor of Commentary, Robert Warshow. Later she was the executive editor of Harper's Magazine under Willie Morris. She then began working in publishing as an editor at Basic Books and Legacy Books. Her writing has been published in Commentary, First Things, The Atlantic, National Review, The New Republic, The Weekly Standard, and The American Spectator.

Together with Donald Rumsfeld, Decter was the co-chair of the Committee for the Free World and one of the original champions of the neoconservative movement with her spouse, Norman Podhoretz. She was also a founder of the Independent Women's Forum, and was founding treasurer for the Northcote Parkinson Fund, founded and chaired by John Train. She was a member of the board of trustees for The Heritage Foundation. She was also a board member of the Center for Security Policy and the Clare Boothe Luce Fund. A member of the Philadelphia Society, she was, for a time, its president. 

Following a tongue-in-cheek remark by Russell Kirk, the Society's founder, about the prevalence of Jewish intellectuals in the neoconservative movement, Decter labelled Kirk an anti-Semite. She was also a senior fellow at the Institute of Religion and Public Life. She was one of the signatories to Statement of Principles for the Project for the New American Century. Decter served on the national advisory board of Accuracy in Media. 

In 2008, Midge Decter received the Truman-Reagan Medal of Freedom from the Victims of Communism Memorial Foundation.

Personal life
Decter married her first husband, Moshe Decter, in 1948. Together, they had two children: Naomi and Rachel, who predeceased Decter in 2013. They divorced in 1954.  Two years later, she married Norman Podhoretz, who went on to become editor of Commentary magazine. They remained married until her death. Together, they had two children: Ruthie Blum and John Podhoretz.

Decter died on May 9, 2022, at her home in Manhattan. She was 94 years old.

Publications
 
 Losing the First Battle, Winning the War
 The Liberated Woman and Other Americans (1970)
 The New Chastity and Other Arguments Against Women's Liberation (1972) 
 Liberal Parents, Radical Children (1975) 
 An Old Wife's Tale: My Seven Decades in Love and War (2001) 
 Always Right: Selected Writings of Midge Decter (2002) 
 Rumsfeld : A Personal Portrait (2003)

References

External links
 

1927 births
2022 deaths
The Heritage Foundation
Jewish American writers
Writers from Saint Paul, Minnesota
New York University alumni
Jewish Theological Seminary of America alumni
University of Minnesota alumni
National Humanities Medal recipients
The American Spectator people
20th-century American non-fiction writers
21st-century American non-fiction writers
20th-century American women writers
21st-century American women writers
American women journalists
21st-century American Jews
Jewish women writers
Neoconservatism